Johnny Williams Jr. (March 13, 1908 − October 23, 1998) was an American jazz tubist and double-bassist.

Early life 
Williams learned to play violin as a child, and switched to tuba as a teenager; he played both this instrument and the stand-up bass while playing in regional territory bands in the southern states.

Career 
Williams relocated to New York City in 1936, where he worked with Red Allen, Buster Bailey, Sidney Bechet, Benny Carter, J.C. Higginbotham, Billie Holiday, Harry James, James P. Johnson, the Mills Blue Rhythm Band, Frankie Newton, and Teddy Wilson. He also played in the bands of Coleman Hawkins and Louis Armstrong in the early 1940s before joining Teddy Wilson's band once again. He and Edmond Hall recorded together in 1944, and worked together until 1947; following this, Williams played with Tab Smith and then with Johnny Hodges in the mid-1950s.

From the 1960s onward, Williams was less active, though he worked occasionally with musicians such as Buddy Tate (1968), Red Richards (intermittently, 1970s), and Bob Greene (1978-82). He played with the Harlem Blues and Jazz Band from 1978 to 1998, when he had a stroke; he died later that year.

References
Footnotes

General references
"Johnny Williams (i)". The New Grove Dictionary of Jazz. 2nd edition, ed. Barry Kernfeld.

American jazz tubists
American male jazz musicians
American jazz double-bassists
Male double-bassists
1908 births
1998 deaths
Jazz musicians from Tennessee
20th-century double-bassists
20th-century American male musicians
Harlem Blues and Jazz Band members
Mills Blue Rhythm Band members